is a city located in Fukui Prefecture, Japan. ,  the city had an estimated population of 29,435 in 12,057 households and a population density of 240 persons per km2 (327/sq mi). Obama gained publicity in the United States and elsewhere in 2008, as it shares its name with Barack Obama, who was running for, and later became, President of the United States.

Etymology
Obama means "small beach" in Japanese.

Geography
Obama is located in far southwestern Fukui Prefecture, bordered by Shiga Prefecture to the south and the heavily indented ria coast of Wakasa Bay on the Sea of Japan to the north. It is due north of Kyoto, and is about four to seven hours by train from Tokyo. Parts of the city are within the borders of the Wakasa Wan Quasi-National Park.

Neighbouring municipalities 
Fukui Prefecture
Wakasa
Ōi
Shiga Prefecture
Takashima

Climate
Obama has a Humid Subtropical climate (Köppen Cfa) characterized by warm, wet summers and cold winters with heavy snowfall.

Demographics
Per Japanese census data, the population of Obama has declined gradually over the past 50 years.

History
Obama developed as a seaport with connections to the Asian continent even before the start of written history in Japan, and artefacts from China have been found in local tombs from the Kofun period. From the Asuka period and Nara period, salt and seafood from the Obama area were supplied to the Yamato dynasty, and under the Ritsuryō system, Obama was the capital of Wakasa Province. Many temples and cultural remains from the Nara and Heian period are found in the Obama area, and the city labels itself "Nara by the sea" in its tourist promotions. As a result of its location in the Wakasa Province area, which travelers passed through when traveling between China and Kyoto, the area was influenced by Chinese culture for a long period. There are many buildings and houses in the Sancho-machi area of the city whose design was influenced by trade with the Chinese mainland.

In the Edo period, Obama was the jōkamachi of the Obama Domain under the Tokugawa shogunate and was ruled by a branch of the influential Sakai clan. The town remained an important port for the kitamaebune coastal trade, and was the starting point of the Saba-kaidō ("Mackerel highway") connecting the Sea of Japan to Kyoto.

With the establishment of the modern municipalities system on April 1, 1889, the town of Obama was created. It was raised to city status on March 30, 1951 after merging with surrounding municipalities.

Obama is one of the locations where Japanese citizens were abducted by North Korean agents on July 7, 1978.

Government
Obama has a mayor-council form of government with a directly elected mayor and a unicameral city legislature of 18 members.

Economy
The economy of Obama is mixed, with agriculture and commercial fishing playing important roles. Seasonal tourism is of growing importance. Wakasa lacquered chopsticks, agate accessories, and other crafts are made in the area.

Education
Obama has 17 public elementary schools and two middle schools operated by the city government, and three public high schools operated by the Fukui Prefectural Board of Education. The prefectural also operates one special education school.

Fukui Prefectural University has a branch campus located in Obama since 1992. In this short period, the university's Research Center for Marine Bioresources has been noted for its research of preservation and in the fields of fish embryogenesis, aquaculture stock enhancement, fish disease, and microalgeal bloom. The university also has schools (faculties) of Economics, Nursing, Arts and Sciences, Biotechnology, and others.

Transportation

Railway
  JR West – Obama Line

Highway
 Maizuru-Wakasa Expressway

Sister city relations

Sister cities
  Kawagoe, Saitama, Japan
  Nara, Nara, Japan
  Gyeongju, Gyeongsangbuk-do, South Korea

Friendship cities
  Fujinomiya, Shizuoka, Japan
  Pinghu, Zhejiang, People's Republic of China
  Xi'an, Shaanxi, People's Republic of China

Local attractions
Wakasa Wan Quasi-National Park
Wakasahiko Shrine, ichinomiya of Wakasa Province
Wakasa Kokubun-ji, provincial temple of Wakasa Province
Mantoku-ji, Buddhist temple with Japanese garden designed a National Place of Scenic Beauty
site of Obama Castle
site of Nochiseyama Castle, a National Historic Site
Myōtsū-ji
Hosshinji, a working Zen monastery.
Wakasa Historical and Folk Museum
Bukkokuji, a working Zen monastery.

Festivals
 Omizu-okuri (Water Carrying) Festival is held every March 2 on which water is drawn from the Onyu River and presented to the principal image of the temple. This annual event dates back more than 1,200 years.

Relationship with U.S. President Barack Obama 
The city of Obama has received much publicity because it shares its name with former U.S. President Barack Obama. It began when Obama as a Senator gave a 2006 interview to Japanese television network TBS where he noted that, when passing through customs in Narita Airport, the official who inspected his visa said that he was from Obama. The Obama City Hall heard about the interview and the mayor, Toshio Murakami, sent Senator Obama a set of the city's famous lacquer chopsticks, a DVD about the city and a letter wishing him the best. As Senator Obama's presidential campaign progressed, more local businesses began to organize primary parties and put up "Go Obama!" posters, sell "I love Obama" T-shirts, and produce manjū (a type of Japanese confectionery) with Senator Obama's face on them. A hula group began in the town in honor of Senator Obama's home state of Hawaii. The troupe visited Honolulu in June to perform at the Pan Pacific Festival.

Obama has since thanked the town for their gifts and support, saying "I look forward to a future marked by the continued friendship of our two great nations and a shared commitment to a better, freer world".

There are a number of Japanese with the surname Obama. Though the former American President is of Kenyan Luo heritage, it is not uncommon for Japanese and East African names to sound alike.

As a result of the victory by Barack Obama in the 2008 presidential election, the Mayor of Obama City announced to the Japanese press that he intends to commission a statue of Barack Obama to be put in front of the city hall "as a token of the great historical moment for the name Obama". On January 20, 2009, the day that Barack Obama was sworn into office, the city of Obama celebrated the inauguration with women dancing the hula at the Hagaji Temple.

On November 14, 2009, President Obama specifically acknowledged his connection with Obama by mentioning it and its citizens in a speech at Suntory Hall in Tokyo.

In 2013, Obama mayor Koji Matsuzaki gave a red lacquer pen to Japanese Prime Minister Shinzo Abe to give to President Obama.

Film and TV 
 Cable TV Wakasa Obama, a cable television and internet services provider in Fukui Prefecture, headquartered in Obama

References
Specific

General
 Isao Soranaka: Obama: The Rise and Decline of a Seaport. In: Monumenta Nipponica, Jg. 52, Nr. 1, 1997.

External links
 
 
 
  
  
 Obama city (Japan)  in English from Sister city: Nara City Home Page
 Obama city (Japan)  in English from Sister city: Kawagoe City Home Page

 
Cities in Fukui Prefecture
Populated coastal places in Japan